Martyn Fonnereau (19 March 1741 – 18 May 1817) was the second son of Zachary Philip Fonnereau, a British merchant and banker of Huguenot extraction.

He was a Director of the Bank of England from 1771 to 1783.

He and his younger brother Thomas were named in the will of Jane (Poyntz) Malcher, which prompted the precedential case Fonnereau v. Poyntz in 1785.

References

1741 births
1817 deaths
Members of the Parliament of Great Britain for English constituencies
British MPs 1774–1780
British MPs 1780–1784
People associated with the Bank of England